Barbara Sue Boxer (née Levy; born November 11, 1940) is an American politician and lobbyist who served in the United States Senate, representing California from 1993 to 2017. A member of the Democratic Party, she previously served as the U.S. representative for California's 6th congressional district from 1983 until 1993.

Born in Brooklyn, New York City, Boxer graduated from George W. Wingate High School and Brooklyn College. She worked as a stockbroker for several years before moving to California with her husband. During the 1970s, she worked as a journalist for the Pacific Sun and as an aide to U.S. Representative John L. Burton. She served on the Marin County Board of Supervisors for six years and became the board's first female president. With the slogan "Barbara Boxer Gives a Damn", she was elected to the United States House of Representatives in 1982, representing California's 6th district.

Boxer won the 1992 election for the U.S. Senate. Running for a third term in 2004, she received 6.96 million votes, becoming the first person to ever get more than 6 million votes in a Senate election and set a record for the most votes in any U.S. Senate election in history, until her colleague, Dianne Feinstein, the senior senator from California, surpassed that number in her 2012 re-election. Boxer and Feinstein were the first female pair of U.S. Senators representing any state at the same time. Boxer was the ranking member of the Environment and Public Works Committee and the vice chair of the Select Committee on Ethics. She was also the Democratic Chief Deputy Whip.

On January 6, 2005, Boxer joined Representative Stephanie Tubbs Jones (D-Ohio) in filing a U.S. Congressional objection to the certification of Ohio's Electoral College votes in the 2004 U.S. presidential election.

Boxer did not seek re-election in 2016. She was succeeded by former California Attorney General and current Vice President Kamala Harris. In January 2020, Boxer joined Washington, D.C.-based lobbying firm Mercury Public Affairs as co-chairwoman. In January 2021, it was reported that Boxer was working as registered foreign agent for Hikvision, a Chinese state-sponsored surveillance company implicated in human rights abuses, which prompted the Biden inaugural committee to return a donation she had made. After initially defending her work for Hikvision, she reversed course and publicly announced she had deregistered as a foreign agent. In October 2021, Boxer, along with former Los Angeles Mayor Antonio Villaraigosa and former California State Assembly Speaker Fabian Nunez, led a high-profile mass exodus of employees from Mercury's California office to form their own public affairs and consulting company.

Early life and family
Barbara Sue Levy was born in Brooklyn, New York City, to Jewish immigrants Sophie (née Silvershein; born in Austria) and Ira Levy.<ref name=history>"Boxer, Barbara," History, Art, and Archives, house.gov. Retrieved 26 Jul 2021.</ref> She attended public schools, and graduated from George W. Wingate High School in 1958.

In 1962, she married Stewart Boxer and graduated from Brooklyn College with a bachelor's degree in economics. While in college she was a member of Delta Phi Epsilon sorority and was a cheerleader for the Brooklyn College basketball team.

Boxer worked as a stockbroker for the following three years while her husband went to law school. Later, the couple moved to Greenbrae, in Marin County, California, and had two children, Doug and Nicole. In 1968, she worked on the presidential primary campaign of antiwar challenger Eugene McCarthy who was running against President Lyndon B. Johnson. In 1970, she co-founded the anti-Vietnam War Marin Alliance.

Boxer first ran for political office in 1972, when she challenged incumbent Republican Peter Arrigoni, a member of the Marin County Board of Supervisors, but lost a close election. Later in the 1970s, Boxer worked as a reporter and editor for the Pacific Sun and then managed the Marin campaign of John Burton, the brother of Phillip Burton, who then was the Congressman representing southern San Francisco, California. John intended to run against incumbent Republican District 6 Congressman William S. Mailliard from Belvedere, California. The district would be renumbered as the 5th District in January 1975. However Mailliard resigned on March 5, 1974, so John also ran in the special election to fill the remainder of the incumbent's 6th District term. Burton narrowly won both crowded races and was sworn into office in 1974, gaining seniority on those new members being seated in 1975, and Boxer became his staff aide.

In 1976, Boxer was elected to the Marin County Board of Supervisors, serving for six years. She was the Board's first female president.

On May 28, 1994, her daughter Nicole married Tony Rodham, the younger brother of Hillary Clinton, in a ceremony at the White House attended by 250 guests. (This was the first White House wedding since Tricia Nixon married Edward Cox in 1971.) Before divorcing, they had a child Zachary, born in 1995. Between January 2001 and January 2009, Zachary held a unique distinction of being both the grandson and nephew of sitting U.S. senators.

In 2006, the Boxers sold their house in Greenbrae, where they had lived for many years, and moved to Rancho Mirage. Boxer's first novel, A Time to Run, was published in 2005 by San Francisco-based Chronicle Books. Her second novel, Blind Trust, was released in July 2009 by Chronicle Books.

At 4'11" (150 cm), Boxer was one of the shortest members of the Congress. When addressing the chamber, she would sometimes stand on a portable platform, dubbed the "Boxer Box", which was carried by an aide.

U.S. Representative

Boxer, then a Marin County supervisor, was elected to the United States House of Representatives in 1982, succeeding John Burton. Her slogan was "Barbara Boxer Gives a Damn". In the House, she represented  (Marin and Sonoma Counties) for five terms. She narrowly won her first election with 52 percent of the vote, but easily won reelection four times, never dropping below 67 percent of the vote.

Boxer was a member of the original Select Committee on Children, Youth, and Families that was established in 1983.

In 1992, Boxer was implicated in the House banking scandal, which revealed that more than 450 congressional representatives and aides, herself included, wrote overdraft checks covered by overdraft protection by the House Bank. In response, she issued a statement saying "in painful retrospect, I clearly should have paid more attention to my account" and wrote a $15 check to the Deficit Reduction Fund for each of her 87 overdrafts.

In 1991, during the Anita Hill Senate hearings, where Hill accused U.S. Supreme Court nominee Clarence Thomas of sexual harassment, Boxer led a group of women House members to the Senate Judiciary Committee – demanding that the all-white, all-male Committee of Senators take Hill's charges seriously.

U.S. Senator

Elections
Four-term incumbent Democratic Senator Alan Cranston retired in 1992, creating an open seat contest. In what was billed as the "Year of the Woman", Boxer beat fellow Rep. Mel Levine and Lieutenant Governor Leo McCarthy in the Democratic primary, winning 44% of the vote. In the general election Boxer defeated Republican Bruce Herschensohn, a conservative television political commentator from Los Angeles, by 4.9%. A last-minute revelation that Herschensohn had attended a strip club at least partially affected the outcome. In 1998, she won a second term, beating sitting California State Treasurer Matt Fong by 10.1% of the vote. After facing no primary opposition in the 2004 election, Boxer defeated GOP candidate Bill Jones, the former California Secretary of State, by 20%. In 2010, Boxer defeated Republican candidate Carly Fiorina, former chief executive officer of Hewlett-Packard, by 10%.

Committees
 Committee on Commerce, Science, and Transportation
 Subcommittee on Aviation Operations, Safety, and Security
 Subcommittee on Consumer Protection, Product Safety, and Insurance
 Subcommittee on Oceans, Atmosphere, Fisheries, and Coast Guard
 Subcommittee on Surface Transportation and Merchant Marine Infrastructure, Safety, and Security
 Subcommittee on Science and Space
 Committee on Environment and Public Works (Ranking Member)
 Committee on Foreign Relations
 Subcommittee on Near Eastern and South and Central Asian Affairs
 Subcommittee on East Asian and Pacific Affairs
 Subcommittee on International Operations and Organizations, Human Rights, Democracy and Global Women's Issues (Chair)
 Subcommittee on International Development and Foreign Assistance, Economic Affairs, and International Environmental Protection
 Select Committee on Ethics (Vice Chair)

A member of the Senate Democratic Leadership, Boxer served as the Democratic Chief Deputy Whip, which gives her the job of lining up votes on key legislation.

Caucus memberships
 Senate Oceans Caucus
 Senate Ukraine Caucus

Legislation sponsored
The following is an incomplete list of legislation that Boxer introduced in the Senate:
 HIV Organ Policy Equity Act (S. 330; 113th Congress) – a bill that would allow organs from HIV positive patients to be donated and transplanted into patients who are also HIV positive, a procedure that is currently illegal. This change would allow hundreds of additional organ transplants to take place in the United States each year.

Presidential politics

2004

On January 6, 2005, Boxer joined Representative Stephanie Tubbs Jones (D-Ohio) in filing a U.S. Congressional objection to the certification of Ohio's Electoral College votes in the 2004 U.S. presidential election. She called the objection her "opening shot to be able to focus the light of truth on these terrible problems in the electoral system". The Senate voted the objection down 74–1; the House voted the objection down 267–31. It was only the second Congressional objection to an entire State's electoral delegation in U.S. history; the first instance was in 1877.

2008
As a superdelegate, Boxer had declared that she would support the winner of the California primary, which was won by Hillary Clinton. However, she reneged on that pledge and remained neutral, only officially backing Barack Obama's candidacy the day after the last primaries, once he had garnered enough delegate votes to clinch the nomination.

2016
Prior to Hillary Clinton's announcement, on October 20, 2013, Senator Boxer was one of sixteen Democratic female senators to sign a letter endorsing Clinton as the Democratic nominee in the 2016 U.S. presidential election.

Post-Senate life

Since leaving the U.S. Senate, Boxer has notably given paid speeches; raised money for her political action committee (PAC for Change); hosted a weekly podcast with her daughter, Nicole Boxer; and worked as a lobbyist and foreign agent. In 2021, an assault and robbery against her also made news.

In April 2017, Boxer served as the keynote speaker for the Environmental Student Assembly's Earth Month at the University of Southern California.

Lobbying

In January 2020, it was reported that Boxer had become co-chair of Mercury Public Affairs, a prominent lobbying and public affairs firm, whose corporate clients have included Airbnb and AT&T, along foreign governments such as Qatar and Turkey.

Prior to joining Mercury Public Affairs, Boxer had worked as a paid advisor to Lyft, during which time she advocated against the passage of AB-5, a California law that Lyft opposed which reclassified as "employees" many workers, including Lyft drivers, who had previously been classified as "independent contractors" under state labor law.

Boxer also has worked as a paid consultant on behalf of Poseidon Water as part of that company's effort to install a desalination plant in Huntington Beach, California, and also for CityLift Parking, a company in Oakland, California, that designs automated parking lifts.

In October 2021, Boxer, former Los Angeles Mayor Antonio Villaraigosa, and former California State Assembly Speaker Fabian Nunez led a high-profile mass exodus of employees from the California office of Mercury Public Affairs to set up their own public affairs and consulting firm. At the time of their departure, the press reported Mercury's California based clients included Clorox, Lyft, the California Charter Schools Association, and the Westlands Water District, the utility that oversees the heart of the state's agricultural lands in the Central Valley.

Foreign agent
On January 12, 2021, it was reported that the inaugural committee of president-elect Joe Biden returned a $500 donation from Boxer after Boxer registered as a foreign agent on behalf of Hikvision, a Chinese state owned manufacturer of surveillance equipment. The company has been accused of involvement in the persecution of Uyghur Muslims in the Xinjiang region.
In an emailed statement to the press regarding the returned donation, Boxer defended her work as a registered foreign agent by saying, "When I am asked to provide strategic advice to help a company operate in a more responsible and humane manner consistent with U.S. law in spirit and letter, it is an opportunity to make things better while helping protect and create American jobs.”

Later that same day, Boxer reversed course and publicly announced on Twitter that she would deregister as a foreign agent for Hikvision, writing, "Due to the intense response to my registration I have determined that my continued work has become a negative distraction from my effort to preserve American jobs and make the company better.  Therefore I have deregistered."

Assault and robbery
On July 26, 2021, Boxer was assaulted and robbed of her mobile phone in the Jack London Square section of Oakland, California. A $2,000 reward is being offered for information that leads to an arrest. Boxer was not seriously injured in the attack.

Platform and votes

George W. Bush
Senator Boxer was, along with Iowa Senator Tom Harkin, one of only two Senate Democrats to support Wisconsin Senator Russ Feingold's resolution to censure President George W. Bush.

Bush nominees
During the confirmation hearings for the United States Secretary of State nominee Condoleezza Rice in January 2005, Boxer challenged her to admit to alleged mistakes and false statements made by the Bush Administration in leading the United States into the 2003 invasion of Iraq, and ultimately voted against confirmation, along with twelve other senators. The dissent was the highest vote against a Secretary of State nominee since 1825 when Henry Clay was so named.

Boxer voted against John Bolton's nomination for U.S. Ambassador to the United Nations in the Senate Foreign Relations Committee and filibustered him on the Senate floor. Because of the strong Democratic opposition, Bolton could not obtain Senate approval. However, President Bush bypassed the Senate by employing the constitutional right of recess appointment, only the second time such an appointment has been used for a United States ambassador to the United Nations since the UN's founding in 1945. Recess appointments themselves have been used numerous times by various presidents.

Boxer voted against the confirmation of Chief Justice of the United States nominee John Roberts, and against the confirmation of Associate Justice nominee Samuel Alito.

Economy
Senators Boxer and John Ensign (R-NV) are the authors of the Invest in the USA Act. This legislation, which was signed into law in October 2004 as a small part of the more comprehensive American Jobs Creation Act, is intended to encourage American companies to bring overseas profits back to the United States, to create jobs in the U.S., and stimulate domestic economic growth.

In March 2004, Boxer offered an amendment to the Federal budget to create a $24 billion jobs reserve fund. The amendment would set aside funds for a variety of investments to improve the economy and create jobs by establishing a manufacturing jobs tax credit for companies that create jobs in the United States, expanding investment in science research and development, providing a tax credit to small businesses to pay for health insurance for their employees, and expanding trade adjustment assistance to help those who lose their jobs because of foreign trade. The Boxer amendment would also end the tax break that companies receive after moving plants overseas.

On October 1, 2008, Boxer voted for Emergency Economic Stabilization Act.

Senator Boxer was one of only eight members of the Senate to vote against the repeal of the Glass-Steagall Act in 1999 before the Financial Crises.

On August 26, 2013, Boxer told The Ed Show on MSNBC that the federal minimum wage should be raised to $10.00 an hour.

Education
Boxer established the Excellence in Education award to recognize teachers, parents, businesses and organizations working to make positive changes in education. Since 1997 Senator Boxer has presented the Excellence in Education Award to 38 recipients.

Election and Electoral College reform
Boxer voted for the 2002 Help America Vote Act, which mandated the use of voting machines across the country, among other provisions. On February 18, 2005, Senator Boxer and colleagues introduced the Count Every Vote Act of 2005, which would provide a voter-verified paper ballot for every vote cast in electronic voting machines and ensure access to voter verification for all citizens. The bill mandates that this ballot be the official ballot for purposes of a recount. The bill sets a uniform standard for provisional ballots and requires the Federal Election Assistance Commission to issue standards that ensure uniform access to voting machines and trained election personnel in every community. The bill also mandated improved security measures for electronic voting machines. The bill did not pass.

Boxer also introduced a bill on November 15, 2016, calling for a constitutional amendment to abolish the Electoral College and to select future presidents by a simple national vote only. This was done six days after Donald Trump won the 2016 election despite losing the national popular vote to Hillary Clinton.

 Energy 
Boxer opposed the nuclear energy deal between the United States and India. She believes India should not receive aid from the U.S. in the civilian nuclear energy sector until it breaks its relationship with Iran.

Environment
Boxer successfully led the 2003 Senate floor battle to block oil drilling in the Arctic National Wildlife Refuge. In 2005, Boxer voted again to block oil drilling at ANWR.

Boxer introduced the National Oceans Protection Act (NOPA) of 2005. Some of the provisions of this act are: strengthen ocean governance; protect and restore marine wildlife and habitats; address ocean pollution; improve fisheries management. The bill also addresses needs regarding marine science, research and technology, marine mammals, coastal development, and invasive species.

Boxer is an original cosponsor of Senator Jim Jeffords' (I-VT) Clean Power Act. This legislation would reduce emissions of three pollutants coming from power plants; sulfur dioxide, nitrogen oxides, and mercury, and also reduce emissions of carbon dioxide.

Senator Boxer was the Senate sponsor of the Northern California Coastal Wild Heritage Wilderness Act, which was signed into law by President George W. Bush on October 17, 2006. Senator Boxer worked with Senator Dianne Feinstein and Representative Mike Thompson (the bill's House sponsor) in a five-year effort to pass the legislation.

Boxer along with her colleague Dianne Feinstein voted in favor of subsidy payments to conventional commodity farm producers at the cost of subsidies for conservation-oriented farming.

Foreign policy
In 1997, the Senate passed a Boxer resolution calling on the United States not to recognize the Taliban as the official government of Afghanistan because of its human rights abuses against women.

In 2002, Senator Boxer voted against the proposed US invasion of Iraq. She has subsequently referred to that vote as the best vote of her career. She also voted against the first Gulf War while a member of the House in 1991 and was a very vocal protester against the Vietnam War in the 1970s.

Boxer was a cosponsor of S. 495, or the Darfur Accountability Act of 2005, which would impose sanctions against perpetrators of crimes against humanity in Darfur.

In 2012 she and a bipartisan group of six senators introduced a resolution condemning Russia for aiding Syrian President Bashar al-Assad's government as the country faced civil war.

Iraq War
In October 2002, Boxer voted against the joint resolution passed by the US Congress to authorize the use of military force by the Bush Administration against Iraq.
In June 2005, Senators Boxer and Russ Feingold of Wisconsin, cosponsored Senate Resolution 171 calling for a timeframe for US troop withdrawal from Iraq.

Boxer's petition demanding an exit strategy from Iraq drew 107,218 signatures.

Boxer was sharply critical of US Army General David Petraeus' testimony regarding the political and military situation of Iraq in 2007, charging him with reporting while wearing "rosy glasses".

Gun laws
Senator Boxer joined colleagues to pass a federal ban on various semi-automatic firearms and established the COPS program.

In the wake of the 2016 Orlando nightclub shooting, Boxer posted on Facebook that it was an "unspeakable tragedy" and she encouraged others to support "common-sense gun safety laws to protect our communities from these weapons of war."

Hate crimes
Boxer co-sponsored the Matthew Shepard Act, which expanded the federal definition of hate crimes to include crimes based on the victim's sexual orientation and gender identity.

Health care

Boxer was part of a coalition to increase medical research to find cures for diseases. In 2007, she authored successful bipartisan legislation with Senator Gordon Smith to combat HIV/AIDS and tuberculosis globally. In 1997, she authored a Patients' Bill of Rights. She has written a bill to make health insurance tax-deductible and one to let any American buy into the same health insurance program that members of Congress have. She supports comprehensive prescription drug coverage through Medicare and the right of all consumers to purchase lower-cost prescription drugs re-imported from Canada.

In October 2002, Boxer urged the Bush Administration to take specific steps to address the causes of the steep increase in autism cases in California. She wrote Health and Human Services (HHS) Secretary Tommy Thompson to establish a common national standard for the diagnosis of autism; instruct the CDC and the Agency for Toxic Substances and Disease Registry to convene a task force to review the current literature on autism and conduct its own study if necessary; and direct the National Institutes of Health (NIH) and the Centers for Disease Control (CDC) to work with the states to create a national chronic disease database.

Boxer is an advocate for embryonic stem-cell research, which has the potential to help those with diabetes, Parkinson's disease, Alzheimer's disease, spinal cord injuries, and other diseases.

Intellectual property

Senator Boxer supports PIPA.

LGBT rights
The Human Rights Campaign gave Boxer ratings of 100%, 88% and 100% for the 107th, 108th, and 109th sessions of Congress, indicating support for the HRC's slate of pro-gay rights legislative issues. In 1996, she was one of fourteen Senators to vote against the Defense of Marriage Act and also voted against the Federal Marriage Amendment in 2004 and 2006, although when San Francisco Mayor Gavin Newsom issued a directive to the city-county clerk to issue marriage licenses to same-sex couples she stated that she supported California's domestic partnership law but agreed with its definition that marriage was between a man and a woman. However, her 2010 re-election campaign website states that "Senator Boxer supports marriage equality." She opposed Proposition 8, a constitutional amendment that prohibited same-sex marriage in California, and supported the Uniting American Families Act.

Marijuana
Boxer has come out against reforming marijuana policy and is opposed to the California Ballot measure to legalize and tax marijuana for those 21 and older in the state.

National security
After the September 11 attacks, Boxer authored a bill to protect commercial airliners against attacks by shoulder-fired missiles, and wrote the law allowing airline pilots with special training to carry guns in the cockpit.

Boxer wrote the High-Tech Port Security Act, and sponsored the Chemical Security Act to address terrorist threats against chemical plants. Senator Boxer also cosponsored comprehensive rail security legislation.

Reproductive rights

Boxer maintains a strong stance in support of reproductive rights and the pro-abortion movement. Boxer authored the Freedom of Choice Act of 2004 and participated in the floor fight for passage of the Freedom of Access to Clinic Entrances Act.

Boxer is an original cosponsor of the Title X Family Planning Services Act of 2005, S.844, by Senator Hillary Clinton (D-NY). This legislation aims to improve access to women's health care. It authorizes funding for family planning services grants; allows states to provide such services to individuals who may not be eligible for Medicaid; prohibits health insurance providers from excluding contraceptive services, drugs or devices from benefits; establishes a program to disseminate information on emergency contraception; requires hospitals receiving federal funding to offer emergency contraception to victims of sexual assault; provides grants to public and private entities to establish or expand teen pregnancy prevention programs; and requires that federally funded education programs about contraception be medically accurate and include information about health benefits and failure rates.

She was strongly critical of the Stupak-Pitts Amendment, which would prevent taxpayer-funded abortions possibly resulting in women not being able to pay with their own funds for abortion coverage Affordable Health Care for America Act.

Social Security
Boxer supports the current system of Social Security, and opposed President George W. Bush's plan for partial privatization of Social Security.SOCIAL SECURITY PRESS CONFERENCE 

Surveillance
In June 2008 Boxer spoke in the Senate in opposition to the FISA Amendments Act of 2008, a pending bill in the United States Congress to amend the Foreign Intelligence Surveillance Act, and later broke with her counterpart Sen. Dianne Feinstein and voted against it.

Congressional scorecards
See also* 

Boxer had a very progressive voting record. Project Vote Smart provides the following results from congressional scorecards.
 American Civil Liberties Union – 83% for 2005–2006
 Americans for Democratic Action – 95% for 2006
 American Land Rights Association – 11% for 2006
 Americans for Tax Reform – 5% for 2006
 AFL–CIO – 100% in 2006
 Campaign for America's Future – 100% for 2005–2006
 Conservative Index-John Birch Society – 20% for Fall 2004
 Children's Defense Fund – 100% for 2006
 Drum Major Institute – 100% for 2005
 Family Research Council – 0% for 2006
 FreedomWorks – 17% for 2006
 Gun Owners of America – 0% for 2006
 Humane Society of the United States – 100% for 2005–2006
 League of Conservation Voters – 100% for 2006
 NARAL Pro-Choice America – 100% for 2006
 National Association of Wheat Growers – 0% for 2005
 National Education Association – 100% for 2005–2006
 National Federation of Independent Business – 0% for 2005–2006
 National Journal – Composite liberal score of 95% for 2006
 National Organization for Women – 96% for 2005–2006
 National Rifle Association – F for 2006
 National Right to Life Committee – 0% for 2005–2006
 National Taxpayers Union – 11% for 2006
 Population Connection – 100% for 2006
 Republican Liberty Caucus – 10% for 2005
 Secular Coalition for America – 90% on 2006 scorecards
 United States Chamber of Commerce – 25% for 2006

Public image

Criticizing Condoleezza Rice's judgment
Boxer criticized Secretary of State Condoleezza Rice's judgment in relation to the war in Iraq: "I personally believe – this is my personal view – that your loyalty to the mission you were given, to sell the war, overwhelmed your respect for the truth."

In January 2007, Boxer was in the news for comments she made when responding to Bush's plans to send an additional 20,000 troops to Iraq. "Who pays the price?" Boxer asked Secretary of State Condoleezza Rice. "I'm not going to pay a personal price. My kids are too old and my grandchild is too young. You're not going to pay a personal price with an immediate family. So who pays the price? The American military and their families... not me, not you." When Rice interjected, Boxer responded by saying, "Madam Secretary, please. I know you feel terrible about it. That's not the point. I was making the case as to who pays the price for your decisions. And the fact that this administration would move forward with this escalation with no clue as to the further price that we're going to pay militarily... I find really appalling."

Television appearances
Boxer has made cameo appearances as herself in several television shows, including Murphy Brown (1994), Gilmore Girls (2002) and Curb Your Enthusiasm (2007), as well as a cameo (as herself) in the 2000 film Traffic. On November 2, 2005, she made an appearance on The Daily Show with Jon Stewart to discuss her new novel A Time To Run.

In September 2012, it was reported that Boxer and Republican Senator Olympia Snowe would appear together in an NBC sitcom. On September 20, 2012, she and Senator Snowe appeared in the fifth season premiere of Parks and Recreation. Boxer later returned to Parks and Recreation alongside several other U.S. senators in early 2015 in the seventh season episode "Ms. Ludgate-Dwyer Goes to Washington."

In November 2016, Boxer appeared in an episode of Chelsea, presented by Chelsea Handler, entitled "Do Not Despair About Our Country", filmed shortly after the result of the 2016 US presidential election was known, during which Handler wept about the result.

Awards and honors
Boxer has been awarded two Doctor of Laws honorary degrees, one from Mills College and the other from Dominican University of California.

Ethics
The Foundation for Ethics in Public Service has accused Boxer of failing to disclose real property on her Personal Financial Disclosure Reports between 2002 and 2010. Boxer failed to disclose a million dollar home she owns.

Major speeches and statements
 
 Transcript from the Confirmation Hearing of Condoleezza Rice, January 18, 2005
 
 
 
 
 
 
 
 On Karl Rove's CIA Leak, July 20, 2005
 
 
 Addressing World Affairs Council of Northern California (Video), October 13, 2006

Congressional service

Electoral history

Boxer was first elected to the Senate by a 4.9% margin in 1992. She was reelected in 1998, in 2004, and in 2010.

See also
 Women in the United States House of Representatives
 Women in the United States Senate

References

Further reading
 
 Johnston, Robert D. "Barbara Boxer" Jewish Women: A Comprehensive Historical Encyclopedia

External links

 Senator Barbara Boxer official U.S. Senate website
 
 
Articles
 "Barbara Boxer: Rice Hearings and the 2004 Vote", Terry Gross, Fresh Air, NPR, February 10, 2005
 "Barbara Boxer Interview", Ruth Conniff, The Progressive'', July 2005
 Barbara Boxer speaks at The World Affairs Council of Northern California video, October 13, 2006

1940 births
20th-century American politicians
20th-century American writers
20th-century American women politicians
20th-century American women writers
21st-century American politicians
21st-century American novelists
21st-century American women writers
21st-century American women politicians
Activists from California
Activists from New York (state)
American gun control activists
American people of Austrian-Jewish descent
American abortion-rights activists
Brooklyn College alumni
County supervisors in California
Democratic Party United States senators from California
Female members of the United States House of Representatives
Female United States senators
Jewish members of the United States House of Representatives
Jewish United States senators
Jewish women politicians
Members of Congress who became lobbyists
Living people
Democratic Party members of the United States House of Representatives from California
Politicians from Brooklyn
People from Greenbrae, California
People from Rancho Mirage, California
United States congressional aides
Women in California politics
Novelists from California
Novelists from New York (state)
Jewish American people in California politics
21st-century American Jews